Glebe or The Glebe, an electoral district of the Legislative Assembly in the Australian state of New South Wales had two incarnations, from 1859 to 1920 and from 1927 to 1941.


Election results

Elections in the 1930s

1938

1935

1932

1930

Elections in the 1920s

1927

1920 - 1927

Elections in the 1910s

1917

1913

1910

Elections in the 1900s

1907

1904 by-election

1904

1901

Elections in the 1890s

1898 by-election

1898

1895

1894

1891

Elections in the 1880s

1889

1887

1885

1883 by-election

1882

1880

Elections in the 1870s

1877

1874

1873 by-election

1872

Elections in the 1860s

1869

1865 by-election

1864

1860

Elections in the 1850s

1859

Notes

References

New South Wales state electoral results by district